CBQ-FM is a Canadian radio station, airing the Canadian Broadcasting Corporation's CBC Music network at 101.7 FM in Thunder Bay, Ontario.

The station was launched on August 13, 1984.

External links 
 

BQ
BQ
Radio stations established in 1984
1984 establishments in Ontario